The "Cougar Fight Song" is the official college fight song of the University of Houston (UH).  It was written by Marion Ford with lyrics by Forest Fountain, both UH students.  It is typically performed by the Spirit of Houston.  

The "Cougar Fight Song" was popularized by Ed Gerlach, a UH music professor, and his orchestra in the 1950s.  In 2002, Norm Maves, Jr. of The Oregonian named the song as the 7th best college fight song in America.

Lyrics

References

American college songs
College fight songs in the United States
American Athletic Conference fight songs
University of Houston traditions
Houston Cougars
Songs about Texas